The 2002 Speedway World Cup Event 2 was the second race of the 2002 Speedway World Cup season. It took place on August 5, 2002 in the Poole Stadium in Poole, Great Britain.

Results

Heat details

References

See also 
 2002 Speedway World Cup
 motorcycle speedway

E1
Speedway
2000s in Dorset
2002 in British motorsport